This is a list of glaciers in Europe.

Austria

Eiskar
Pasterze Glacier
Schlatenkees Glacier
Kitzsteinhorn Glacier
Hintertux Glacier
Stubai Glacier
Pitztal Glacier
Rettenbach glacier
Dachstein Glacier

Bulgaria
Banski Suhodol Glacier
Snezhnika (southernmost in Europe)

France

Mer de Glace
Glacier d'Argentière
Glacier d'Arsine
Glacier de Bellecote
Glacier de Bionnassay
Glacier de Borne Pierre
Glacier de la Plate des Agneaux
Glacier de Taconnaz
Glacier de Trelatete
Glacier des Bossons
Glacier du Peclet
Glacier de Saint Sorlin, Glacier de l'Etendard
Glacier de Gebroulaz
Glacier de Sarennes
Glacier Noir
Glacier Blanc
Glacier des Glaciers
La Grande Motte

Georgia

Abano
Adishi
Bokho
Chata
Denkara
Devdaraki
Dolra
Donguzorun
Gergeti
Ledeshdvi
Lekhziri Glacier
Mna
Notsarula
Tsaneri
Tviberi

Germany

Höllentalferner
Schneeferner
Watzmann Glacier
Blaueis

Iceland

Barkárdalsjökull
Eiríksjökull
Eyjafjallajökull
Drangajökull
Gljúfurárjökull
Langjökull
Hjaltadalsjökul
Hofsjökull
Kaldaklofsjökull
Kambsjökull
Myrkárjökull
Mýrdalsjökull
Snæfellsjökull
Sólheimajökull
Tindfjallajökull
Torfajökull
Tungnafellsjökull
Tungnahryggsjökull
Vatnajökull
Vindheimajökull
Þórisjökull
Þrándarjökull
Þverárjökull

Italy
The Italian glaciological committee reports more than 700 glaciers in Italy.

Belvedere Glacier
Bors glacier
Brenva Glacier
Calderone glacier (Ghiacciaio del Calderone)
Canin Glacier
Careser Glacier
Forni Glacier
Frebouge Glacier
Lex Blanche Glacier
Lobbia Glacier
Loccie Glacier

Madaccio Glacier
Mandrone Glacier
Mare Glacier
Marmolada Glacier
Miage Glacier (Ghiacciaio del Miage)
Montasio Glacier
Planpincieux Glacier
Platigliole Glacier
Praz-Sec Glacier
Presena Glacier
Sesia Glacier (Ghiacciaio del Sesia)
Toula Glacier
Tresero Glacier
Triolet Glacier

Norway

Austfonna
Blåmannsisen
Buarbreen
Folgefonna
Frostisen
Gihtsejiegŋa
Harbardsbreen
Hardangerjøkulen
Jostedalsbreen
Myklebustbreen
Nordre Folgefonna
Okstindbreen
Spørteggbreen
Sulitjelma Glacier
Svartisen
Søndre Folgefonna
Sørbreen
Øksfjordjøkelen

Romania
Scarisoara Glacier
Focul Viu Glacier

Russia

 Academy of Sciences Glacier (Lednik Akademii Nauk) - Severnaya Zemlya
 Albanov Glacier (Lednik Al'banova) - Severnaya Zemlya
 Anna Glacier (Lednik Anny) Anuchin Glacier (Lednik Anuchina) Arkhangel Bay Glacier (Lednik Arkhangel'skoy Guby) Brounov Glacier (Lednik Brounova) Borzov Glacier (Lednik Borzova)
 Bull Glacier (Lednik Bull)
 Bunge Glacier (Lednik Bunge)
 Chayev Glacier (Lednik Chayeva)
 Chernishev Glacier (Lednik Chernishëva) Dezhnev Glacier (Lednik Dezhnëva) - Severnaya Zemlya
 Glazov Glacier (Lednik Glazov) Goluboy Glacier (Lednik Goluboy) Grotov Glacier (Lednik Grotov) - Severnaya Zemlya
 Inostrantsev Glacier (Lednik Inostrantseva) Karbasnikov Glacier (Lednik Karbasnikova) Karpinskov Glacier (Lednik Karpinskogo) - Severnaya Zemlya
 Kirov Glacier (Lednik Kirova) - Franz Josef Land
 Kolka Glacier
 Krayniy Glacier (Lednik Krayniy) Kropotkin Glacier (Lednik Kropotkina) Kropotkin Glacier (Severnaya Zemlya) (Lednik Kropotkina) - Severnaya Zemlya
 Kupol Lunnyy, ice cap - Franz Josef Land
 Lakrua Glacier (Lednik Lakrua) Mack Glacier (Lednik Maka) Malyutka Glacier (Lednik Malyutka) - Severnaya Zemlya
 Middendorff Glacier (Lednik Middendorfa) - Franz Josef Land
 Molochnyy Glacier (Lednik Molochnyy) - Franz Josef Land
 Molotov Glacier (Lednik Molotova) - Severnaya Zemlya
 Moschnyy Glacier (Lednik Moschnyy) Mushketov Glacier (Lednik Mushketova) - Severnaya Zemlya
 Nansen Glacier (Lednik Nansena) Neponyatyy Glacier (Lednik Neponyatyy) - Severnaya Zemlya
 Nizkiy Glacier (Lednik Nizkiy) Nordenskiöld Glacier (Lednik Nordenshel'da) Obruchev Glacier (Lednik Obrucheva) - Franz Josef Land
 Otdel’nyy Glacier (Lednik Otdel’nyy) - Severnaya Zemlya
 Pavlov Glacier (Lednik Pavlova) Payer Glacier (Lednik Payyera) - Franz Josef Land
 Petersen Glacier (Lednik Petersena) Pioneer Glacier (Lednik Pioner) - Severnaya Zemlya
 Popov Glacier (Lednik Popova) Polisadov Glacier (Lednik Polisadova) Rikachev Glacier (Lednik Rykachëva) Roze Glacier (Lednik Roze) Rozhdestvensky Glacier (Lednik Rozhdestvenskogo) Rusanov Glacier (Lednik Rusanova) - Severnaya Zemlya
 Semyonov-Tyan-Shansky Glacier (Lednik Semënova Tyan-Shanskogo) - Severnaya Zemlya
 Serp i Molot Glacier (Lednik Serp i Molot) Severnyy Glacier (Lednik Severnyy) Severny Island ice cap (Largest by area in Europe)
 Shirokiy Glacier (Lednik Shirokiy) Shokalsky Glacier (Lednik Shokal'skogo) Schmidt Island ice cap - Severnaya Zemlya
 Sonklar Glacier (Lednik Sonklar) - Franz Josef Land
 Sredniy Glacier (Lednik Sredniy) Stremitel’nyy Glacier (Lednik Stremitel’nyy) - Franz Josef Land
 Taisiya Glacier (Lednik Taisiya) University Glacier (Lednik Universitetskiy) - Severnaya Zemlya
 Vavilov Glacier (Lednik Vavilova) - Severnaya Zemlya
 Velken Glacier (Lednik Vel'kena) Vershinsky Glacier (Lednik Vershinskogo) Vitte Glacier (Lednik Vitte) Viz Glacier (Lednik Viz) - Franz Josef Land
 Vize Glacier (Lednik Vize) Voyekov Glacier (Lednik Voyekova) Vuster Glacier (Lednik Vuster) - Franz Josef Land
 Yuzhnyy Glacier (Lednik Yuzhnyy) Zemlya Georga Ice Cap - Franz Josef Land
 Znamenityy Glacier (Lednik Znamenityy) - Franz Josef Land

Slovakia
Great Cold Valley Glacier (Veľká studená dolina)'' - Vysoké Tatry

Slovenia
Triglav Glacier
Skuta Glacier

Spain
Glaciers in the Sierra Nevada and the Picos de Europa melted by the end of the 19th century. In 2006, ten small glaciers and six glaciers-glacierets remain in the Spanish Pyrenees. The largest are on:

Aneto: the Maladeta and Aneto glaciers.
Monte Perdido: Gabietous, Taillon and Monte Perdido glaciers.
Picos del Infierno: Infierno glacier.
Posets: Llardana glacier.
Vignemale: Oulettes and Ossue glaciers.
Mont Valier: Arcouzan.

The pyrenees have a lot of small glaciers that have stopped moving or haven't been studied since becoming very small. For example, in the Monte Perdido masif there were many more glaciers, like the Grieta, the La cascade, the Marboré, the Paillas (two glaciers), and the Astazou. As of today these glaciers still have glacier snow and some, like the Astazou or the Paillas, that are the biggest, could be considered glaciers, but they haven't been studied in recent years.

Sweden
Sweden has a total of around 300 glaciers. The largest is Stuorrajekna in Sulitelma with an area of 13 km2.

Switzerland

Aletsch Glacier
Allalin Glacier
Brunegg Glacier
Corbassière Glacier
Fee Glacier
Ferpècle Glacier
Fiescher Glacier
Findel Glacier
Gauli Glacier
Gorner Glacier
Haut Glacier d'Arolla
Bas Glacier d'Arolla
Hufi Glacier
Kander Glacier
Lang Glacier
Lower Grindelwald Glacier
Mont Miné Glacier
Morteratsch Glacier
Oberaletsch Glacier
Oberaar Glacier
Otemma Glacier
Plaine Morte Glacier
Rhône Glacier
Saleina Glacier
Trift Glacier
Glacier de Tsijiore Nouve
Glacier de Tsanfleuron
Unteraar Glacier
Upper Grindelwald Glacier
Zinal Glacier
Zmutt Glacier
Vorab Glacier

Images

See also
List of glaciers
Southernmost glacial mass in Europe

References

Further reading

 
Europe
Glaciers